Webosaurs is a former MMORPG (Massively Multiplayer Online Role Playing Game), which involved a virtual world containing online games and activities, developed by American studio Reel FX Entertainment. Players could use cartoon dinosaur-avatars and play in a landscape-set world, with a variety of different themes. Beta-testing was made available to the general public on June 25, 2009 and expanded, making it an online community. In 2012, Webosaurs shut down for unknown reasons. Free non-memberships were available, revenue was predominantly raised through paid memberships, allowing players to access additional features (such as the ability to buy more virtual clothing, and in-game pets through use of in-game currency.)

The game was designed for ages 5–12. Thus a major focus from the developers was built on child safety, including offering a "Safe Chat" mode, where users could select their comments from a menu; filtering that prevented swearing and the revelation of personal information; and moderators (along with veteran players) who policed the game.

History and development
The Webosaurs domain was originally bought in 2007 by Webosaurs Director, Jacques Panis, after noticing a lack of a popular virtual world in which his two sons could safely interact with each other and others. He soon joined VFX company, Reel FX Creative Studios, who also saw the potential to create a unique online environment for others to interact in. Reel FX hired the Metaverse Mod Squad to provide moderation services to the game, and outsourced development to two other companies. After two years of development, Webosaurs released into closed-beta on June 25, 2009, and then proceeded with 4 months of beta testing.  Webosaurs officially went into general availability on October 22, 2009.

On September 30, 2011, after months of development, Reel FX released a major new update dubbed: "Webosaurs: Rise of Spike." This update was informally known as, "Webosaurs 2.0," as this had been the first major update in many months. This update added many new elements to game play, including "missions" around the game, where the player must adventure the island to figure out why the antagonist, "Spike," is attempting to take over the island. Also released was a multiplayer "monster" battle, where players battle an evil monster, known as, "OKAVANGO who serves Spike. The monster attacked the room where the players were, while the players fought back using weapons in the game. Players could also level up, and unlock rewards for doing so.

Rules
The Webosaurs developers had a major focus on child safety, creating rules to help keep players safe and entertained. Players were required to follow rules made by the staff. Failing to do so may have resulted in muting (players could not see the muted player's speech bubble), kicking from the server, moderator messages (messages sent to the player by the moderator), or banning from the game.

Respect the community, and other players. Cyber-bullying and all other forms of disrespectful behavior are not tolerated at Webosaurs.
Keep your password, do not share any account details with other players.
Learn how to ignore and report another player. If another player is misbehaving, first Ignore them and then Report them.
On the forums and when sending in artwork, don't use someone else's work and pretend it's yours.
Remember that no one at Webosaurs will ever ask you for your password.

Characters

Playable characters
Rexxy - A Tyrannosaurus. Rexxy is the leader of the group.

Horns - A Triceratops. Horns loves to show off and flex. He hates losing in games. He also found the "Swamp-Juice".

Pterry - A Pterodactyl. Pterry is one of the Island's inventor.

Stretch - A Brachiosaurus. Stretch is very laid back, Friendly and loves to surf.

Non-playable characters
Spike - An Ankylosaurus. The main antagonist. He (tries to) took over the island in Webosaurs. The event of it known as Rise of Spike (even though he had still been known before that).

Linus - A Stegosaurus. Linus gives out the quests in Rise of Spike. Linus has a mustache & wears a Tuxedo.

Okvango - A giant squid monster owned by Spike. He could be fought in monster battles. Okvango was found during Halloween by Pterry.

Dr. Nanosaurus - A pterodactyl. He is also an inventor who lives inside a lab with Pterry.

Ole Smithy - A Triceratops. A blacksmith who owns an Armory in Croc Peninsula.

Stokeosaurus - Another Triceratops. Stokeosaurus wears a cowboy jacket, and he owns two Stores: One could be found at Sanoran Sands area & A Pet Shop which could be accessed by the Gushing Geyser Area.

Edmarka - A Brachiosaurus. A seller, her shop (Edmarka's Town Store) could be found in the Gushing Geyser area.

Goby - An unidentified Dromaeosauridae, possibly a Velociraptor. A tour-guide, he shows the first time player a video with tips & information, yet - his video could be played over and over again.

Membership

Subscribed membership

Players could buy memberships, which allowed them to get more features in Webosaurs. Players who bought a membership got access to more armor styles for their avatar, more virtual furniture for their caves in game, change into different avatar styles, allow them to own a pet in game, and will be able to buy clothing items. Also, members got a larger cave, with extra features, and a small mini-game. Formerly, a package containing various goodies, including comics and cards, was sent out to those who purchased a subscription. This bonus is no longer offered.

Non-members

Webosaurs provided a "non-membership" option. Although such play was free, it did not include all the benefits of being a member. Non-members could still purchase armor for their dinosaur, buy cave items, and play games. Non-members could also receive and use items given out at parties that are held for all players. Non-members could not enter the "Bluggin' Beach Bunker" (a member's only room), purchase pets, purchase some armor, or purchase some actions/furniture. Non-members had a smaller cave as well.

Game features

Emoticons
Players could choose to express their feelings by using emoticons. This feature could be used by both subscribed members and non-subscribed members. When the game released, there were only 8 emoticons, but on January 12, 2010, 8 more were added. There were 16 emoticons, such as many happy faces, a sad face, and an angry face. Each emoticon could be viewed from a speech bubble above the avatar's head.

Items

Players could use the virtual coins they collect from playing mini games to purchase various items from a variety of different shops. There were shops for actions, armor (the basic type of virtual-clothing), furniture, and virtual-pets. Subscribed members could also make their own player cards and purchase dinosaur-avatars.

Each player had a player card, used to store inventory such as player card backgrounds, downloads, virtual-clothing, and different dinosaur-avatars. Clothing could be worn by all players, however some of it was only available to subscribed-members. The same applied for furniture and for "caves" (the basic virtual-house). Subscribed-members also had the benefit of having a larger cave than non-subscribed members, and may have music in their cave as well.

Pets

Subscribed-members had the option to buy virtual-pets, which could be bought in the "Gushing Geyser" landscape, to care for, and show in-world. Pets were available as a smilodon (misspelled as "slimodon" in the information box in the Pet Shop in the Gushing Geyser and known throughout the world as "Little Fang"), crocodile, porcupine and panda (known throughout the world as "Panda Fang").

Pets also had a happiness bar chart to indicate their status. Pets that were not "taken care" of, ran away, and had to be replaced. This also applied in the case of when a player owned a pet, but their membership expired. However, the pet returned to the owner as soon as the membership was renewed.

Scrolls

Scrolls could be found in every landscape-set room. Scrolls contained comics of the main characters Rexxy, Stretch, Horns, and Pterry (the Webosaurs mascots) discovering and exploring the island. They were used to unlock virtual-rooms, but on February 27, 2010, you could have access to most rooms without scrolls, after many players didn't know how to use or find scrolls.

Webosodes
There were videos found featuring Nigel Marven as the host, as he talked about animals. Webosodes could be viewed by both members and non-members.

Fossil Magic

There were 8 "Fossil Magics" in Webosaurs. The Grow, Shrink, Glow, and Stink magic could be found in the Fossil Magic Store which is located in Sanoran Sands. The Skeleton, Snowman, and Ball magic could be found in the catalog in the menu bar. There was also a Ghost magic which could be found in the catalog, but it is currently unavailable.

Reception and criticism

Common Sense Media gave Webosaurs four out of five stars, and stated that the content was suitable for children aged eight and up. The review gave good marks for safety and educational value, but questioned the worth of paid subscriptions, summarizing: "Skip the subscription -- the free membership should keep kids entertained just fine."

Video games

Dino Surf

Dino Surf is a free iPhone game that was released on Jan 25, 2010. Players are able to choose from the 4 mascots of Webosaurs. The player races to the finish line while maneuvering through obstacles, jumping over ramps, and running over arrows to get a speed boost. Upon finishing one race, you will move onto the next. The objective of the game is to finish each stage in the shortest amount of time possible. There are 4 different landscapes (desert, swamp, snow, and volcano) each consisting of 4 stages. After completing the game, the player received a promotional code that could be used in the online game to receive 1,000 coins of in-game currency. Currently the game has a few glitches due to ios updates, but it is still playable.

References

§

External links
 Webosaurs Home Page

2009 video games
Flash games
Miniclip games
American children's websites
Browser-based multiplayer online games
Inactive massively multiplayer online games
Video games developed in the United States